Prime Prep Academy was a grouping of charter schools in Texas cofounded in 2012 by Deion Sanders, a former American football and baseball player (the school's name is derived from his "Prime Time" moniker), who has also coached at the schools. Initial enrollment was more than 1,100 students. Prime Prep had campuses in Oak Cliff, Dallas and Fort Worth. The school was established with the goal of giving every child a free laptop supported by the VSCHOOLZ program. In January 2014, Superintendent Ron Price turned over documents to the Tarrant County District Attorney's office alleging that hundreds of laptops had been stolen from Prime Prep. He later gave the information to the FBI. The school was closed January 30, 2015, due to financial insolvency.

Prime Prep athletics had an initial setback in its first year when the program was unable to field an eligible football team based on the rules of the University Interscholastic League (UIL), which governs interscholastic activities of public schools (including charter schools) in Texas. It had recruited significant portions of existing championship teams and "league hopping" athletes.  After the issues were worked out, the school had problems finding opponents for their football team.  Ultimately Prime Prep would withdraw from the UIL and participate as an independent program.

The school was accused of racism and influence peddling.  In December 2013, Sanders pressured cofounder D.L. Wallace, a local minister, out of the leadership of the schools over accusations of fraud and assault. Shortly afterwards Sanders was fired from his head coach position, sparking an attempt by the school board to oust the superintendent who had fired Sanders. The school then received further negative press for violations of the state's board meeting laws, theft, eviction, and staff members failing to follow established policies. The school was featured in local news coverage again in 2014 for failing to hold open meetings and ranked as the lowest performing elementary school in North Texas as judged by Children at Risk.  In July 2014, it was announced that the Texas Education Agency was going to revoke the school's charter for inconsistencies with the National School Lunch Program and fiscal mismanagement to which the school responded that they were going to appeal the decision. In October 2014, the school stopped forwarding paycheck withholdings to the IRS, which had been averaging $25,000 to $28,000 per month. The IRS would later file a tax lien of $56,625.

In 2012, Prime Prep served as a backdrop for a reality TV series starring Sanders titled Deion's Family Playbook.

Since 2013, Prime Prep and its nonprofit sponsor, Uplift Fort Worth, have been the subject of a federal lawsuit alleging wrongdoing in the National School Lunch Program. As of March 24, 2018, the case was still pending.

The concept was birthed in 2009 as an elite NFL Scouting Combine training facility boasting the name Prime U, and its program was aired on NFL Network for two seasons. Notable members of the original Prime U were Sanders, Kevin Mathis, Omar Stoutmire, Duke Rousse, and Lucas Chizzonite.

Notable alumni

 Elijah Thomas (born 1996), basketball player for Bnei Herzliya in the Israeli Basketball Premier League

References

Education in Dallas
Schools in Fort Worth, Texas
Charter schools in Texas
Educational institutions established in 2012
Educational institutions disestablished in 2015
2012 establishments in Texas